My Reflection, also known as Christina Aguilera: My Reflection or My Reflection: Live, is a television special starring American singer Christina Aguilera, that premiered on Sunday, December 3, 2000 on ABC. It was directed by Lawrence Jordan and executive produced by Aguilera herself, alongside Ken Ehrlich. The special is a televised concert of Aguilera's performance at the Shrine Auditorium in Los Angeles, California. The special features guest appearances by Lil Bow Wow, Dr. John and Brian McKnight. It features songs from Aguilera's three studio albums, Christina Aguilera (1999), Mi Reflejo (2000), and My Kind of Christmas (2000), as well as covers. The show attracted 10.5 million viewers.

Video album 

The special was released as Aguilera's second video album through RCA Records and Image Entertainment. It became a commercial success, being certified gold by the Recording Industry Association of America (RIAA) and platinum by the Australian Recording Industry Association (ARIA) as well as reaching number one and eight respectively in the music video charts of those regions.

Track listing

Charts

Certifications

Notes

References

External links 
"Christina Aguilera My Reflection" search results on Newspapers.com

Christina Aguilera video albums
2001 video albums
Live video albums
2001 live albums